Tulelake Municipal Airport  is a public airport adjacent to the community of Newell, California. Primary users are crop dusting and general aviation pilots. There is no scheduled service to Tulelake Muni, and the airport is unattended, with no control tower.

History

The airport is located on the site of the Tule Lake War Relocation Center, a concentration camp used during the Japanese American internment. Tule Lake housed some 29,000 men, women and children between 1942 and 1945, and the foundations or supports of many camp buildings are visible from the air by pilots in the landing pattern.

Following the dismantling of most barracks and other structures, the wide, hard-packed main firebreak and a smaller firebreak road were put to use as runways. The smaller runway was eventually abandoned, with the main runway (11/29) being paved and remaining in use.

Following an announcement by the Federal Aviation Administration of plans to erect a fence around the airport, groups concerned with the historical nature of the area organized support and a petition drive to prevent this action. The planned fence would surround the site of most of the barracks - nearly 46 complete "blocks" and portions of several others - thus making it difficult for visitors to tour the historic site. This will especially impact pilgrimages of former internees, who visit the locations of their former homes.

References

External links 

Airports in Modoc County, California